Hit of the Show is a 1928 comedy film directed by Ralph Ince and starring Joe E. Brown, Gertrude Olmstead and William Bailey. It was originally released as a silent, with some sound added to later versions.

Cast

References

Citations

Sources
 Quinlan, David. The Illustrated Guide to Film Directors. Batsford, 1983.

External links

1928 films
Films directed by Ralph Ince
American silent feature films
1920s English-language films
American black-and-white films
1928 comedy films
Silent American comedy films
Film Booking Offices of America films
Films with screenplays by Edgar Allan Woolf
1920s American films